Malmö Fotbollförening, also known simply as Malmö FF, is a Swedish professional association football club based in Malmö. The club is affiliated with Skånes Fotbollförbund, and plays home games at Stadion. The club's first team play in Allsvenskan as of 2018, the top league in Swedish football, which takes place from April to October every seasons. Malmö FF won Allsvenskan for the first time in 1944, and most recently repeated this in 2017. Malmö FF were at their strongest during the 1970s, when they won five Swedish championships and four Svenska Cupen titles, and performed well in continental competitions: the team were runners-up in both the 1978–79 European Cup and the 1979 Intercontinental Cup.

Since the club was founded, there have been 32 managers and one caretaker. The honours won by the club under each manager's stewardship are also detailed. As of the start of the 2020 season, 31 men have held the post of Malmö FF manager, the most successful of whom in terms of trophies won is Bob Houghton, who, as manager between 1974 and 1980, led the club to three Swedish league championships and four Svenska Cupen wins. The manager who has won most national league titles with the club is Antonio Durán, who won Allsvenskan four times between 1964 and 1971. Although Roy Hodgson led Malmö FF to the Allsvenskan crown five times in a row between 1985 and 1989, the national championship was decided by a championship play-off during this time, and Malmö FF only won this in 1986 and 1988. Houghton is the club's longest-serving manager, having occupied the position between 1990 and 1992 in addition to the aforementioned period, giving him a total of 10 years in charge. The current manager of Malmö FF is Jon Dahl Tomasson, who has been at the club since 10 January 2020.

Managerial history

Early managers (before 1936)
Not much is known about the management of Malmö FF during its early days following its establishment in 1910. Its first team had no official manager until 1917, when Ernst Hjertberg coached the team for a year. The post was then vacant until 1932, except for the 1922 season, when Hans Ruff was manager. Following Malmö FF's first season in Allsvenskan, 1931–32, it employed Carl Wijk as manager. Wijk remained in charge until 1934, when the club was disqualified after 13 matches for breaching Swedish football's ban on professional players. The team was barred from playing for the rest of the season, and demoted a division. Wijk was temporarily banned, along with several other members of the club's non-playing staff.

First foreign managers, and first honours (1936–71)
With Malmö FF back in Allsvenskan from the start of the 1936–37 season, the club once more employed a manager: Václav Simon from Czechoslovakia became the club's first foreign-born manager. After Simon coached the team for a year, he was replaced by Harry Lundahl, who remained until 1941. Carl Ahlberg coached the team from 1942 to 1944. Following his initial tenure between April and November 1944, Sven Nilsson managed the club for two more periods during that decade. During this time he became the club's first Allsvenskan title winning manager, when the team won the league championship at the end of the 1943–44 season. Two Hungarian managers, István Wampetits and Kálmán Konrád, managed Malmö FF between Nilsson's periods in charge. Konrád secured the club's second league title during the 1948–49 season. The team won its third league title in 1950, with Nilsson in charge. Malmö FF continued to be successful during the 1950s: Welshman Bert Turner managed Malmö FF between 1951 and 1954, and led the club to two league championships and two cup titles during this time. He was replaced in 1955 by another foreign-born manager, Austrian Pepi Stroh. Neither Stroh or his successor, former Malmö FF player Nils-Åke Sandell, won any honours. This dry spell ended following the appointment in 1964 of Spaniard Antonio Durán, who coached the club until 1971. During this time Malmö FF won Allsvenskan four times, lifted the cup in 1967, and entered European competitions with limited success.

Englishmen Bob Houghton and Roy Hodgson manage the club to unprecedented success (1971–89)

Karl-Erik Hult managed the club to a cup title in 1973, before Bob Houghton replaced him in 1974. Malmö FF chairman Eric Persson was reportedly initially hesitant to employ Houghton, who at 27 was younger than several of the club's players, but was convinced when the Englishman met them and won their respect and confidence. Houghton had never met any of the players, but had researched them thoroughly; he impressed the team by immediately recognising each of them and knowing them by first name. Duly installed as coach, Houghton led Malmö FF to three league titles and four cup wins over the course of seven seasons, as well as the 1979 European Cup Final (which was lost to Nottingham Forest) and the 1979 Intercontinental Cup (in which Olimpia of Paraguay defeated Malmö FF 3–1 over two legs). Houghton left the club in 1980, but is held in high regard at the club to the present day; a corner section of the club's present stadium, Stadion, is named "Bob's Corner" after him. Fellow Englishman Keith Blunt replaced Houghton, and remained for three seasons before Tord Grip took over. Grip managed Malmö FF to a cup title in 1984 before leaving the same year. Another Englishman, Roy Hodgson, managed the club between 1985 and 1990. Under his leadership, the club won five consecutive Allsvenskan titles, and also won the then-extant league championship play-offs on two occasions, in 1986 and 1988. The side also won cup titles in 1986 and 1989. Hodgson's tenure as Malmö FF manager is the most successful in terms of win percentage and Allsvenskan titles won. Like Houghton, Hodgson also has a section at Stadion: "Roy's Corner". "Bob's Corner" and "Roy's Corner" flank the stadium's standing section on each side.

Recent managers (since 1989)

Hodgson's departure from the club in 1989 marked the start of a 15-year period during which Malmö FF failed to win a league or cup title. Houghton initially returned in Hodgson's place, but the former manager's two-year sojourn back at the club proved largely unsuccessful. He was replaced by Dane Viggo Jensen in July 1992. Jensen returned to Denmark at the end of the 1993 season, and was succeeded by Rolf Zetterlund, who managed the club between 1994 and 1996. Zetterlund's time at the club was fairly successful as the club finished each of his years in charge in the top four league places. Dutchman Frans Thijssen took Zetterlund's place in January 1997, and stayed at the club until August 1998 when he was sacked following poor results in Allsvenskan and European competition. Roland Andersson then managed the club until it was relegated at the end of the 1999 season. As the club had never before been relegated (having only previously been removed from the top division by a punitive demotion), Andersson was sacked. He was replaced by Michael Andersson (no relation), who guided the team to promotion back to Allsvenskan at the first attempt.

Tom Prahl, who had guided Halmstads BK to the league title in 1997 and 2000, took Andersson's place before the start of the 2002 season, and during his first year in charge led Malmö FF to second place in Allsvenskan, the club's best league finish since 1996. After finishing third in 2003, expectations were high during early 2004, when the club signed several well-known players, including FC Barcelona defender Patrik Andersson, a former Malmö FF player. The Swedish press compared this spending spree to those of Real Madrid, and labelled Malmö FF's new collection of players "Real Malmö". Malmö FF lived up to these expectations during the 2004 season by winning the club's first league title since 1989.

After Prahl's contract ran out at the end of 2005, he was replaced by Sören Åkeby. Having won consecutive league titles with Djurgårdens IF in 2002 and 2003, Åkeby was widely respected on his appointment, but he proved unable to continue where Prahl left off. He was let go by the club after two seasons, and replaced by Roland Nilsson. After two seasons with the team, Nilsson guided the club to their 19th Allsvenskan title in 2010, the year of the team's centenary. Nilsson left to manage F.C. Copenhagen in June 2011. Former AIK manager Rikard Norling was appointed on 3 June 2011. After being one goal away from qualifying for the group stage of the 2011–12 UEFA Champions League he guided the club to a fourth position in 2011. The 2012 season almost resulted in a new league title as Malmö FF fought for the title until the last round, in the end the club ended in third place. Norling won the club's 17th Swedish Championship and 20th Allsvenskan title in the 2013 season. Norling announced his resignation on 27 November and cited undisclosed reasons for his decision. On 9 January 2014 the club announced the appointment of Norwegian Åge Hareide as the club's new manager. Hareide was the first non-Swedish manager for the club since Dutchman Frans Thijssen who left Malmö FF in 1998. Hareide had immediate success at the club as he led the team to defend their Allsvenskan title and qualify for the group stage of the 2014–15 UEFA Champions League in his first season. After a second spell in Champions League in 2015, Hareide left the club to coach Denmark national football team and he was replaced by Allan Kuhn

Managers

Information correct as of matches played up until 8 December 2021
Table headers
 Nationality – If the manager played international football as a player, the country he played for is shown. Otherwise, the manager's nationality is given as their country of birth.
 From  and  To – The dates for Hans Ruff up to Michael Andersson are the dates for the first and last competitive match since the exact arrival and departure dates for these managers are unavailable. The exact dates for arrival and departure is displayed from Tom Prahl up to Jon Dahl Tomasson.
 P – The number of games managed for Malmö FF, only competitive matches are counted.
 W – The number of games won as a manager.
 D – The number of games draw as a manager.
 L – The number of games lost as a manager.
 GF – The number of goals scored under his management.
 GA – The number of goals conceded under his management.
 GD – The goal difference under his management.
 Win% – The total winning percentage under his management.
 Allsvenskan titles – The Allsvenskan title winning seasons while managing Malmö FF, the cell is sorted by number of titles won.
 Other honours – Other notable honours the manager has achieved while managing Malmö FF. W = Winners and RU = Runners-up. The cell is sorted by number of honours won.

Footnotes
A. The competitions counted here are: Division 2, Superettan, Svenska Serien, Allsvenskan, Svenska Mästerskapet, Svenska Supercupen, Svenska Cupen, the UEFA Intertoto Cup, the Inter-Cities Fairs Cup, the UEFA Cup Winners' Cup, the UEFA Europa League including the UEFA Cup, the UEFA Champions League including the European Cup and the Intercontinental Cup.
B. Each manager's winning percentage is rounded to one decimal place.
C.  These titles are all equivalent to Swedish championship titles, except for those years noted below in footnote E.
D.  The exact dates for Hjertberg's arrival and departure from the club are not known. Malmö FF took part in only one competitive match during the 1917 season: a 4–1 defeat to IFK Malmö in the Svenska Mästerskapet qualifying round.
E.  Between and including the 1982 and 1990 seasons, the Swedish football championship was decided not by the final standings in Allsvenskan, but by a play-off held following the Allsvenskan season, which pitted the four best-placed clubs against each other in a two-legged cup format. The Malmö FF team won Allsvenskan five times in a row between 1985 and 1989, but had to contest these play-offs each time to claim the national title. Though they won the play-offs in 1986 and 1988, they failed to do so in 1985, 1987 and 1989, and therefore were not Swedish champions those years.

References

 General
  (Swedish)
 Specific

 
Malmo FF managers
Malmo FF